Fred Peloquin (born November 1, 1939 in St. Boniface, Winnipeg, Canada), is a retired professional wrestler best known as for his work in the International Wrestling Alliance as Puppy Dog Peloquin.

Professional wrestling career

Early career
Peloquin began his career in professional wrestling in 1971. He received training from Canadian wrestler/promoter Tony Condello.

From 1980-81, Peloquin worked as an enhancement talent for the American Wrestling Association.

West Four Wrestling Alliance
Peloquin wrestled in Condello's promotion West Four Wrestling Alliance, which would later be known as the International Wrestling Alliance. While there, he managed to win the company's premiere title, the WFWA Canadian Heavyweight Championship.

In 1986, International Wrestling Alliance promoted a crossover event with Stampede Wrestling, during which Peloquin (as Fred Peloquin) wrestled in a losing effort against Moe Malone.

Personal life
Peloquin is the cousin of Canadian professional wrestler Chi Chi Cruz.

Championships and accomplishments
West Four Wrestling Alliance
WFWA Canadian Heavyweight Championship (3 time) 
WFWA Canadian Tag Team Championship (2 time) - with Bobby Jones (2)

References 

Living people
1939 births
People from Saint Boniface, Winnipeg
Professional wrestlers from Manitoba
Stampede Wrestling alumni